Greendale is a lightly populated rural area, part of the Selwyn District, Canterbury, a region of New Zealand's South Island.

One of the first farmers was Thomas William Adams, a pioneer of forestry and education in the area.
Another one of the first farmers was Charles Early who moved to Greendale (Water ford) in 1876.

On 4 September 2010, Greendale became further notable as the location of the strongest earthquake ground-shaking ever recorded in New Zealand, registering an acceleration 1.25 times that of gravity.  This was later exceeded by the 2.2 g recordings during the February 2011 Christchurch earthquake at Heathcote Valley.

Demographics

Charing Cross had a population of 885 at the 2018 New Zealand census, an increase of 42 people (5.0%) since the 2013 census, and an increase of 189 people (27.2%) since the 2006 census. There were 333 households. There were 438 males and 447 females, giving a sex ratio of 0.98 males per female. The median age was 39.8 years (compared with 37.4 years nationally), with 171 people (19.3%) aged under 15 years, 159 (18.0%) aged 15 to 29, 453 (51.2%) aged 30 to 64, and 102 (11.5%) aged 65 or older.

Ethnicities were 89.8% European/Pākehā, 6.8% Māori, 0.7% Pacific peoples, 4.4% Asian, and 4.1% other ethnicities (totals add to more than 100% since people could identify with multiple ethnicities).

The proportion of people born overseas was 19.0%, compared with 27.1% nationally.

Although some people objected to giving their religion, 49.2% had no religion, 40.7% were Christian, 1.0% were Hindu and 2.4% had other religions.

Of those at least 15 years old, 135 (18.9%) people had a bachelor or higher degree, and 99 (13.9%) people had no formal qualifications. The median income was $38,800, compared with $31,800 nationally. The employment status of those at least 15 was that 435 (60.9%) people were employed full-time, 129 (18.1%) were part-time, and 9 (1.3%) were unemployed.

Education
Greendale School is a contributing primary school catering for years 1 to 6.

Notable people 
Sidney Holland – 25th Prime Minister of New Zealand

References

Selwyn District
Populated places in Canterbury, New Zealand